The Kangdŏk Line is an electrified standard-gauge secondary line of the North Korean State Railway running from Namgangdŏk on the P'yŏngra Line to Susŏng on the Hambuk Line.

Ch'ŏngjin Choch'ajang, Ch'ŏngjin's large marshalling yard, is located on this line.

History

The first rail line to reach Susŏng was the Ch'ŏngjin−Ch'angp'yŏng section of the Hamgyŏng Line, opened by the Chosen Government Railway (Sentetsu) on 5 November 1916. On 31 July 1917, the management of Sentetsu was transferred from the Railway Bureau of the Government-General of Korea to the South Manchuria Railway (Mantetsu). Under Mantetsu management, construction of the Hamgyŏng Line was accelerated, and to handle increasing freight traffic on the line, a large marshalling yard, called Ch'ŏngjin Choch'ajang, was built near Ch'ŏngjin.

On 1 December 1941, a new line was opened between Ranam and Ch'ŏngjin to allow trains to bypass the Ch'ŏngjin marshalling yard. The existing line, running via Kangdŏk and the marshalling yard, was detached from the Hamgyeong Line and designated the Kangdŏk Line; at the same time, a  connection from Ch'ŏngjin Sŏhang Station (Ch'ŏngjin West Port, today called Songp'yŏng) to Kangdŏk was built, to allow southbound trains to access the marshalling yard without having to reverse at Ranam.

Services

Two passenger trains are known to operate on this line:

 Local trains 601/604, operating between Ch'ŏngjin Ch'ŏngnyŏn and Kŭndong, run on this line between Namgangdŏk and Kŭndong;
 Local trains 608/608'609, operating between Kŭndong and Songp'yŏng, run on this line between Kŭndong and Namgangdŏk.

Route

A yellow background in the "Distance" box indicates that section of the line is not electrified.

Kŭndong Branch

Electrified.

References

Railway lines in North Korea
Standard gauge railways in North Korea